Davy Crockett was a celebrated 19th-century American folk hero, frontiersman, soldier and politician. 

David, Davy or Davey Crockett may also refer to:

People
Davy Crockett (outlaw) (c. 1853–1876), descendant of the frontiersman Davy Crockett
Davey Crockett (baseball) (1875–1961), American baseball player and manager
Davey Crockett, nickname of Davey MacManus of the Welsh band The Crocketts
David Crockett (wrestling) (born 1946), pro wrestling announcer

Arts and entertainment
Davy Crockett (play), a popular 1872 play
Davy Crockett (1910 film), a 1910 American silent film
Davy Crockett (1916 film), a 1916 American silent film 
Davy Crockett (miniseries), a 1954 five-part TV serial on Disneyland
Davy Crockett, King of the Wild Frontier, a 1955 film using footage from the Disneyland serial
Davy Crockett and the River Pirates, a 1956 theatrical film made from the two final episodes of the Disneyland serial
"Davey Crockett", a track from the 2010 album Fang Island by indie rock band Fang Island
"Davey Crockett (Gabba Hey!)", a song by Thee Headcoatees (see Gabba Gabba Hey), later covered by the Spanish girl band Hinds

Other uses
Davy Crockett (nuclear device), a tactical nuclear recoilless gun
Davy Crockett (book), a 1934 biography of the American folk hero written for children by Constance Rourke

See also
"The Ballad of Davy Crockett", a 1955 song with music by George Bruns and lyrics by Thomas W. Blackburn
Crockett (disambiguation)

Crockett, Davy